Podarcis latastei, the Pontian wall lizard, is a species of lizard in the family Lacertidae. It is endemic to Italy.

References

Podarcis
Reptiles described in 1879
Endemic fauna of Italy